Tee Kai Wun (born on 17 April 2000) is a Malaysian badminton player. He helped Malaysia win a silver medal in the 2017 BWF World Junior Championships mixed team event. In 2021, he won three titles (two in men's together with Man Wei Chong and one in mixed doubles together with Teoh Mei Xing) in the Polish Open and Spanish International.

Career 
Tee Kai Wun won his first senior title at the 2019 Bangladesh International in the men's doubles event with Chang Yee Jun. He later teamed-up with Man Wei Chong and won the 2021 Polish, Spanish , and Irish challenger event.

In 2022, Tee claimed his first World Tour title by winning the Super 300 event at the Syed Modi International in the men's doubles partnering Man Wei Chong. In May, he competed at the 2021 Southeast Asian Games in Vietnam, and helps the Malaysia team won the silver medal in the men's team event. In July, Tee and Man captured their second World Tour title at the Taipei Open beating reigning Olympic champion Lee Yang and Wang Chi-lin in three games.

Achievements

BWF World Tour (2 titles) 
The BWF World Tour, which was announced on 19 March 2017 and implemented in 2018, is a series of elite badminton tournaments sanctioned by the Badminton World Federation (BWF). The BWF World Tour is divided into levels of World Tour Finals, Super 1000, Super 750, Super 500, Super 300 (part of the HSBC World Tour), and the BWF Tour Super 100.

Men's doubles

BWF International/Future Challenge/Series (5 titles, 3 runners-up) 
Men's doubles

Mixed doubles

  BWF International Challenge tournament
  BWF International Series tournament
  BWF Future Series tournament

References

External links 
 

2000 births
Living people
People from Malacca
Malaysian sportspeople of Chinese descent
Malaysian male badminton players
Competitors at the 2021 Southeast Asian Games
Southeast Asian Games silver medalists for Malaysia
Southeast Asian Games medalists in badminton